Aspredinichthys tibicen, the tenbarbed banjo, is a species of banjo catfish found in coastal brackish waters and coastal rivers in South America from Venezuela to Brazil including the island nation of Trinidad and Tobago. This species practices an unusual method of incubation of the eggs, attaching them to the underside of the female who then carries them around. This species is of minor importance in commercial fisheries and is also seen in the aquarium trade.

References 
 

Aspredinidae
Fish of South America
Fish of Brazil
Taxa named by Achille Valenciennes
Fish described in 1840